Antifa may refer to:

Literature 
 Antifa: The Anti-Fascist Handbook, a 2017 book by historian Mark Bray

Organisations 
  ('Anti-Fascist Action'), German group active in 1932–1933
 Anti-Fascist Action, a British group active 1985–2001
 , a Swedish group active since 1993

Wider movements and ideology 
 Anti-fascism, history of fascism's opposition before and during WWII
 Post-World War II anti-fascism
 Antifa (Germany), a far-left political movement in Germany
 Antifa (United States), a movement of left-wing American activist groups

See also 
 Rosa Antifa, an Austrian group in Vienna active since 1995
 Rose City Antifa, an American group in Portland, Oregon, active since 2007